De Vargas is a Spanish surname. Notable people with the surname include:

Andrés de Vargas (1613–1647), Spanish painter
Diego de Vargas (1643–1704), Spanish colonial governor
Francisco de Vargas (born 1970), Paraguayan lawyer and politician
Francisco de Vargas y Mexia (died 1566), Spanish diplomat and writer
Gutierre de Vargas Carvajal (1506–1559), Spanish Roman Catholic bishop
José de Vargas Ponce (1760–1821), Spanish erudite, poet and writer
Luis de Vargas (1502–1568), Spanish Renaissance painter
Urbán de Vargas (1606–1656), Spanish Baroque composer
Valentin de Vargas (1935–2013), American actor

Spanish-language surnames